KATU (channel 2) is a television station in Portland, Oregon, United States, affiliated with ABC. It is owned by Sinclair Broadcast Group alongside La Grande–licensed Univision affiliate KUNP (channel 16). Both stations share studios on NE Sandy Boulevard in Portland, while KATU's transmitter is located in the Sylvan-Highlands section of the city.

KATU went on the air as the fourth commercial station in Portland in 1962. It was built by Fisher Broadcasting Company, later Fisher Communications, and originally served as an independent station before joining ABC in 1964.

History

Channel 2 comes to Portland

Channel 2 was not initially assigned to Portland, being allocated in 1957. That action spurred activity on the valuable frequency. Four applications were initially received, from The Oregon Journal, owner of KPOJ (1330 AM); Fisher Broadcasting Company, which owned KOMO-AM-KOMO-TV in Seattle; Tribune Publishing Company, owner of KTNT-TV in Tacoma, Washington; and KPTV (channel 12), which wanted to move to channel 2. KPTV later withdrew, and KPOJ dropped its application in March, but it was not until the end of 1959 that an FCC hearing examiner recommended Fisher over the Tribune Publishing Company for the channel 2 construction permit. The full commission began drafting paperwork in support of this decision in December 1960, and Fisher received the permit on February 23, 1961.

Work began to build facilities in the former Crystal Laundry on NE Sandy Boulevard in June; the two-story building was refitted to contain two production studios. The station originally was assigned the call letters KOXO, but in line with its "K-2" brand, the station adopted the KATU designation that month.

KATU began broadcasting on March 15, 1962, originally operating as an independent station; Portland native and actress Jane Powell was the master of ceremonies.

While it was the 25th independent in the United States, from the moment it went on air, speculation swirled that KATU might look to poach a network affiliation from one of the three other commercial stations in Portland. Rumors intensified in June 1963 as KATU began construction of a transmitter in Portland's West Hills, which would improve its signal coverage and co-site channel 2 with the other major stations. The news came in early December when ABC announced it would drop KPTV (channel 12), Oregon's oldest television station, and move to KATU on March 1, 1964. The news led to speculation that the ABC switch to KATU, in spite of KPTV performance comparable to that of other ABC affiliates, was a countermove by the network to avoid losing Seattle's KOMO-TV, one of the network's few top-rated stations at the time, to a possible move by CBS. KPTV—which had been ABC's Portland affiliate since 1959—sued, alleging that Fisher coerced ABC into affiliating with KATU by threatening to defect in Seattle. (It was the second time KPTV had lost an affiliation to a group owner in five years; King Broadcasting Company's KGW-TV displaced KPTV as the NBC television affiliate in Portland in 1959, and its KING-TV in Seattle replaced KOMO in the network lineup.)

After a decade in which the station struggled to build an identity in the market, KATU began to find its way in the early 1970s after expanding its local programming. New shows such as public affairs program Town Hall, weekend children's program Bumpity, and talk show AM Northwest proved critical to the station's success. AM Northwest continues to air, while other shows, such as Faces & Places and Two at Four, ended in the 1980s.

KATU was Portland's first commercial station to broadcast in digital, doing so in 1998 alongside Oregon Public Broadcasting. KATU shut down its analog signal, over VHF channel 2, on June 12, 2009, the official date in which full-power television stations in the United States transitioned from analog to digital broadcasts under federal mandate. The station's digital signal remained on its pre-transition UHF channel 43, using virtual channel 2.

Sinclair Broadcast Group ownership
On April 10, 2013, KATU and Fisher Communications' other holdings were acquired by the Sinclair Broadcast Group. The Federal Communications Commission granted its approval of the deal on August 7, and the sale was completed the following day.

On May 8, 2017, Sinclair Broadcast Group entered into an agreement to acquire Tribune Media—owner of CW affiliate KRCW-TV (channel 32)—for $3.9 billion, plus the assumption of $2.7 billion in debt held by Tribune, pending regulatory approval by the FCC and the U.S. Department of Justice's Antitrust Division. Sinclair would have been required to sell one of KATU or KRCW-TV if the deal were to be approved. However, in 2018, the FCC designated the deal for hearing by an administrative law judge; the deal was then terminated by Tribune.

News operation

From the station's first day on air, KATU produced local newscasts. As an independent, its late-night local news aired at 10 p.m. This changed after the station switched to ABC in 1964, but KATU remained mired in third place in local news coverage behind KOIN-TV and KGW-TV, which were said to have a "stranglehold" on Portland viewers.

One Oregon news event covered by KATU cameras in the station's first decade on air acquired lasting notoriety. In November 1970, reporter Paul Linnman, who worked at KATU from 1967 to 1972 before returning to the station in 1984 and retiring from TV news in 2004, traveled to Florence, Oregon, where a sperm whale washed ashore; its carcass was exploded unsuccessfully. The station continued to receive requests for footage years after the event and has since commemorated anniversaries of the exploding whale, including a news special in 1995 and a remaster of the original newsfilm in 2020.

In 1975, Richard Ross left KGW-TV after 19 years to become the news director at channel 2. That same year, former Oregon governor Tom McCall joined KATU as commentator; prior to becoming governor, he had also worked at KGW. Under Ross, the station produced such efforts as Kidwitness News, a monthly newscast for kids anchored by puppets; the station's documentary unit won a Peabody Award in 1981. McCall's commentaries continued appearing despite his battle with cancer leading up to his January 1983 death.

News hires at KATU in the 1980s included Jeff Gianola, who initially joined as a weekend weather presenter in 1983 and became evening anchor before defecting to KOIN in 1998, and Bill O'Reilly, the future Fox News Channel anchor whose tenure in Portland lasted less than a year due to family reasons. O'Reilly's time with the station was marked by remarks about Portland being a "vacation" compared to his previous job in Boston, which displeased management, and an incident in which he left his paycheck in a copy machine, unwittingly divulging a six-figure salary that irked underpaid colleagues. By 1985, what had once been a five-person staff in the early days had become a 60-person news department.

KATU had worked its way up to having the top-rated newscasts in Portland by 1997, but ratings were starting to decline before Gianola's departure for KOIN, which was responsible for leading a resurgence at that station. In 1997, the station's general manager concocted a promotional strategy, known as the "Power of 2", by which the station acquired two news helicopters, in an attempt to increase falling ratings, even though the news director had previously said helicopters were primarily a marketing tool. The campaign was produced with such secrecy that its first airing took newsroom employees by surprise. Within a month of the highly publicized debut of the second helicopter, the leased helicopter, "JetRanger II", crashed and burned in November while harvesting Christmas trees.

By 2021, KATU had returned to first place in early and late evening news in total viewership, though Fox affiliate KPTV beat it out in morning news. That year, the station attracted industry attention for suspending an entire day of newscasts so the station staff could take stress management training in light of increasing burnout in television news.

Notable former on-air staff 
 Dick Bogle – reporter, and later anchor, from 1968 to 1982; later a city council member
 Anna Canzano – anchor/investigative reporter
 Jack Faust – hosted the weekly public affairs show Town Hall for 13 years (1980–1993) 
 Rob Marciano – meteorologist (1997–2003)
 Cathy Marshall – reporter/anchor (1998–2003)
 Tom Rinaldi –  lead reporter for ESPN and contributor to ESPN College Football, now with Fox Sports
 Roger Twibell – sports reporter (1973–75), now sportscaster for CBS Sports Network
 Brian Wood – reporter/anchor (2008–2021)
 Linda Yu – news anchor (1975)

Technical information

Subchannels
The station's digital signal is multiplexed:

The 32.1 subchannel for KRCW-TV is broadcast by KATU as part of Portland's ATSC 3.0 (NextGen TV) deployment plan; in exchange, KRCW-TV broadcasts KATU in that format.

Translators
KATU is additionally rebroadcast over a network of sixteen low-power digital translator stations:
 Astoria: K26DB-D
 Baker Valley: K27MX-D
 Corvallis: K08PZ-D
 Hood River: K28CQ-D
 La Grande: K32LY-D
 La Grande: K35GA-D
 Lincoln City, etc.: K32NK-D
 Madras: K26NX-D
 Milton-Freewater: K28FT-D
 Pendleton: K34DI-D
 Prineville: K35LD-D
 Rainier: K31HK-D
 Rockaway Beach: K23NS-D
 The Dalles: K18HH-D
 Tillamook: K34PJ-D
 Grays River/Lebam, WA: K20NL-D

References

External links

ABC network affiliates
Charge! (TV network) affiliates
Comet (TV network) affiliates
Stadium (sports network) affiliates
Sinclair Broadcast Group
Peabody Award winners
Television channels and stations established in 1962
ATU
1962 establishments in Oregon